Hayley Lewis (born June 7, 1993) is an American model, singer, and sportscaster. She was crowned Miss Tennessee on June 22, 2014, at the Carl Perkins Civic Center in Jackson, Tennessee.  Her singing group placed fourth in the world in a Times Square vocal competition.  Lewis supports the Children's Miracle Network after receiving support from a badly broken arm when she was four years old. She's currently working as a Sports Anchor at KSHB-TV at Kansas City, Missouri.

Early life and college
Lewis is born in Kansas City, Missouri and graduated from Belmont University She interned at WKRN-TV in Nashville, Tennessee while at college.

Career
Before going to KSHB-TV and back to her hometown in 2019, she worked at KEZI at Eugene, Oregon.

References

External links
Hayley Lewis' bio at KSHB

1993 births
Living people
American beauty pageant winners
Miss America 2015 delegates
Miss Tennessee winners
American television reporters and correspondents
People from Kansas City, Missouri